Wehshi Gujjar is a 1979 Pakistani Punjabi action musical movie produced by Haji Mohabbat Ali.

starring Sultan Rahi, Aasia, Iqbal Hassan, Afzaal Ahmed, and Adeeb. It was written and directed by Yunus Malik, Anwar Kamal Pasha.

Plot
The movie was first to be released as 'Jagga Tax' but the name was changed to 'Wehshi Gujjar' later.

Cast
Sultan Rahi
Aasia
Najma
Iqbal Hassan
Afzaal Ahmed
Sawan
Bahar Begum
Adeeb
Jaggi Malik
Khayyam
Munawwar Saeed
Altaf Khan
Changezi
Saleem Hassan
Zahir Shah
Iqbal Durrani
Badal

Guest appearances
Chakori
Ishrat Choudhary
Mizla
Imrozia

Track list
The film soundtrack was composed by the musician Ustad Tafu, with lyrics by Hazeen Qadri and sung by Noor Jehan, Mehnaz.

References

1970s crime action films
Pakistani crime action films
Pakistani fantasy films
Punjabi-language Pakistani films
1979 films
1970s Punjabi-language films